Tony Paskins (5 December 1927 – 15 August 2019) was an Australian rugby league footballer who played in the New South Wales Rugby League (NSWRL) and English Rugby Football League (RFL) competitions as well as playing rugby union for the Randwick club in Sydney.

Playing career

Paskins was recruited from Sydney's Randwick rugby union club by English rugby league club Workington Town. Tony Paskins played right- in Workington Town's 18–10 victory over Featherstone Rovers in the 1951–52 Challenge Cup Final d at Wembley Stadium, London on Saturday 19 April 1952, in front of a crowd of 72,093. He was a founder member of Other Nationalities against English national sides playing in the first Other Nationalities game in 1949.

Tony Paskins played right- and kicked three-conversions in Workington Town's 12–21 defeat by Barrow in the 1954–55 Challenge Cup Final at Wembley Stadium on Saturday 30 April 1955, in front of a crowd of 66,513.

A goal kicking three-quarter back, Paskins returned to Australia, along with fellow Australian and Workington Town teammate Rupert Mudge in 1955. Paskin was named captain of Eastern Suburbs side, playing 54 matches for the club in the years (1955–58). After leaving Easts he enjoyed success with the local Oberon side in rural New South Wales. In 1961 he was named as the captain of the Country New South Wales rugby league team and the following year captained New South Wales against the touring Great Britain national rugby league team although he was never selected to play for the Australian national team.

Coaching career

Paskins returned to the NSWRL in 1963 where he spent a season as joint captain and coach of the Manly-Warringah club.

Paskins moved to Forster, New South Wales in 1967 and took over as captain-coach of the Forster Tuncurry Hawks in 1968. He guided the side to premierships in that year, the 1969 grand final and 1970.

Tony Paskins coached the Sydney Roosters club in the 1973 NSWRFL season.

References

External links
» Legends Evening 50's
France defeated in 'Battle of the Boulevard'
Floodlit feast at Odsal
'It’s about time too'
30 April 1955 Photograph of Workington Town

1927 births
2019 deaths
Australian rugby league coaches
Australian rugby league players
Australian rugby union players
British Empire rugby league team players
Manly Warringah Sea Eagles captains
Manly Warringah Sea Eagles coaches
Manly Warringah Sea Eagles players
Other Nationalities rugby league team players
Rugby league centres
Rugby League XIII players
Sydney Roosters coaches
Sydney Roosters players
Workington Town players